The Radetzky class was a group of three semi-dreadnought battleships built for the Austro-Hungarian Navy between 1907 and 1910. All ships were built by the STT shipyard in Trieste. They were the last pre-dreadnoughts built by the Austro-Hungarians, and the penultimate class of any type of Austro-Hungarian battleship completed. They were armed with four  guns in two twin turrets and eight  guns in four twin turrets.

Commissioned only a few years before the outbreak of World War I, the ships had limited service careers. All three of the battleships conducted training cruises in the Mediterranean Sea in 1912. In 1913, they took part in an international naval demonstration in the Ionian Sea that protested the Balkan Wars. After Italy declared war on Austro-Hungary and the other Central Powers in 1915, the three Radetzky-class ships bombarded coastal targets in the Adriatic Sea. After 1915, their participation in the war became minimal. All three ships were handed over to Italy after the end of the war, and broken up for scrap between 1920 and 1926.

Development 

By the end of July 1905, the Austrian Commander in Chief of the Navy, Admiral Monteccuccoli, laid out his vision for an expanded Austro-Hungarian fleet. This included twelve battleships, four armored cruisers, eight scout cruisers, eighteen destroyers, thirty-six large torpedo boats, and six submarines. A navy design board evaluated five designs for the new battleship type between 25 and 29 September 1905.

The first task which needed to be accomplished before construction on any new ships could begin was securing the necessary funding. While naval spending was growing rapidly after 1905, particularly a result of the patronage of Archduke Franz Ferdinand, the heir to the Austro-Hungarian throne; he and Montecuccoli had succeeded in attracting public support, neither the budgets of 1905 or 1906 included spending allocations for an additional class of battleships. With construction on the Erzherzog Friedrich and Erzherzog Ferdinand Max nearly completion in April and May 1905, two large slipways at the Stabilimento Tecnico Triestino in Trieste were freed up for the first time in years. In a speech to the Austrian Reichsrat in July 1906, Montecuccoli lobbied hard to put these slipways to use by saying, "The best defense of a coast lies certainly in a powerful offensive. But...we could not go on the offensive against the fleet of any great power." The budgets passed and the Navy soon went to work assigning shipyards in Triest for the construction of the ships.

Ships of these types were sometimes called "semi-dreadnoughts". The first design was armed with four  guns in two twin turrets, four  guns in single turrets, and eight  guns in casemates. The second design retained the 28 and 24 cm guns as in the first version, though altered the tertiary guns to twelve  guns. The third design, representative of the new dreadnought type of battleship that was being contemplated in other navies, featured eight 28 cm guns in four twin turrets, one fore, one aft, and two wing turrets. The heavy secondary guns were dispensed with altogether, and the light-caliber guns were increased to sixteen 10 cm guns. The fourth design was a variation on the third type; the eight 28 cm guns were replaced by six  guns, in two twin turrets and two single turrets. The 10 cm guns remained the same. The final design mounted four 30.5 cm guns in two twin turrets, eight 19 cm guns in four wing turrets, and twelve 10 cm guns in casemates. The leader of the design staff, Siegfried Popper, advocated the construction of an "all-big-gun" ship.

Popper eventually relented, after admitting that the larger dreadnought type design would also warrant the construction of a new floating dry dock, which would significantly increase the cost of the project. The design board selected the fifth design, though during refinement of the design, the secondary guns were increased in caliber from 19 cm to 24 cm. The 30.5 cm gun was chosen because the breech of the new 28 cm was unreliable. The resulting design was the last pre-dreadnought type of battleship built by the Austro-Hungarian navy.

Underwater protection was also emphasized. Between August and November 1906, the Austro-Hungarian navy conducted explosive tests using the 30-year-old ironclad . The tests were generally unsuccessful; as a result, Popper devised a mathematical model to predict the strength the underwater protection system would require to adequately protect the new battleships. The ships were ultimately equipped with an armored double bottom for defense against mines and torpedoes.

Design

General characteristics 

Machinery consisted of two four-cylinder vertical triple expansion engines. Each engine was powered by six Yarrow boilers.

Armament 

The Radetzky-class ships, as noted above, carried a main battery of four 30.5 cm (12 in) 45-caliber guns in two twin gun turrets. The guns were built by Škoda Works in Pilsen. They were capable of a rate of fire of three shells in the first minute, and then 1 to 2 rounds per minute afterward. The turrets could depress to −3° and elevate to 20°. These turrets suffered from a number of design faults; among them were the overly-large cupolas on top. If a cupola was struck by gunfire, the thin top armor could be peeled back. Another serious issue was a defect in the ventilation system: when the turret was being ventilated under combat conditions, the system would duct toxic propellant gases into the gun house. It was estimated that the turrets contained only 15 minutes of oxygen once the ventilation system was activated.

The ships carried a heavy secondary battery of eight 24 cm (9.4 in) guns in four twin turrets. The turrets were mounted amidships, two on either side. These guns had nearly half the penetration power of the larger 30.5 cm guns, and approximately 25% shorter range. The secondary armament was augmented by twenty 10 cm L/50 guns in single mounts. These guns fired  shells at a rate of between 8 and 10 rounds per minute. Radetzky and her sisters also carried several smaller caliber guns, including two  L/18 landing guns, four  L/44 and one 47 mm L/33 quick-firing guns. After refits in 1916–1917, each ship had four Škoda 7 cm K16 anti-aircraft guns installed. Three  torpedo tubes were also carried, two on the beams and one in the stern.

Armor 

The main battery turrets were heavily armored. The casemates that mounted the 10 cm guns were protected with  worth of armor plating. The armored conning tower had 250 mm-thick sides and a 100 mm-thick roof.

Ships

Service careers

Pre-war 

The three Radetzky-class battleships were assigned to the 2nd Division of the 1st Battle Squadron, alongside the  ships in the 1st Division. The three ships conducted several training cruises in the Mediterranean Sea after their commissioning in 1910–1911. Radetzky was present during the British Coronation Review at Spithead in 1911. The following year, the three ships were involved in an international naval demonstration to protest the raging Balkan Wars;during the operation the first seaplanes to be launched from a warship in combat were operated from Radetzky and her sisters.

World War I 

The assistance of the Austro-Hungarian fleet was called upon by the German Mediterranean Division, which consisted of the battlecruiser  and light cruiser . The German ships were attempting to break out of Messina, where they had been coaling prior to the outbreak of war—British ships had begun to assemble off Messina in an attempt to trap the Germans. By this time, the Austro-Hungarians had not yet fully mobilized their fleet, though the three Radetzkys and three Tegetthoffs, along with several cruisers and smaller craft, were available. The Austro-Hungarian high command, wary of instigating war with Great Britain, ordered the fleet to avoid the British ships, and to only openly support the Germans while they were in Austro-Hungarian waters. On 7 August, when the Germans broke out of Messina, the Austro-Hungarian fleet, including the Radetzky-class battleships, sailed as far south as Brindisi, before returning to port.

In October 1914, the French army established artillery batteries on Mount Lovčen to support the Army of Montenegro against the Austrian army at Cattaro. However, their 24 cm guns were insufficient to dislodge the French artillery batteries, and so Radetzky was sent to assist them. On 21 October, the ship arrived, and the gunfire from her 30.5 cm guns forced the French to abandon the position. On 24 May 1915, all three ships bombarded the Italian coast, including the important naval base at Ancona, following the entrance of Italy into the war on the side of the Triple Entente.

By October 1918, Austria prepared to transfer her entire fleet to the State of Slovenes, Croats and Serbs in order to keep it out of Italian hands. On 10 November 1918, one day before the armistice, Yugoslav officers with scratch crews sailed Radetzky and Zrínyi out of Pola. As they cleared the breakwater at Pola, they sighted the approaching Italian fleet. The two battleships hoisted American flags and sailed south along the Adriatic coast to Castelli Bay near Spalato. They appealed for American naval forces to meet them and accept their surrender, which a squadron of USN submarine chasers in the area did. However, under the subsequent peace treaty, the Allied powers ignored the transfer of the Austro-Hungarian ships to the Yugoslav navy; instead, the ships were to be ceded to Italy. Radetzky and Zrínyi were broken up in Italy between 1920–21; Erzherzog Franz Ferdinand survived until 1926, when she too was scrapped in Italy.

Footnotes

References

External links 
30.5 cm/45 (12") & K10 Škoda, at NavWeaps site (accessed 2016-09-01)

Battleship classes
 
World War I battleships of Austria-Hungary